Taiwan Dancer Technology Co., Ltd. was a Taiwanese aircraft manufacturer based in Nangang Village, Dayuan District, Taoyuan City. The company president was Chin Lien Wei. The company specialized in the design and manufacture of ultralight aircraft in the form of kits for amateur construction.

The first aircraft design, the TD-1 was started in 1996 and was completed in 1999. The company was founded in 2002 and the TD-2 was completed the same year. The third design, the Taiwan Dancer TD-3, was completed in 2007 and won first prize for an aircraft design, awarded by the Taiwanese Ministry of Economic Affairs.

By May 2017 the company website had been taken down and the company seems to have ceased operations.

Aircraft

References

External links
 - former location

 
Aerospace companies of Taiwan
Companies based in Taoyuan City
Vehicle manufacturing companies established in 2002
Taiwanese brands
Ultralight aircraft
Homebuilt aircraft